Alana Evans is an American pornographic actress. She was inducted into the AVN Hall of Fame in 2015 and the XRCO Hall of Fame in 2019.

Career 
Evans entered the sex work industry after her husband was injured in his job. 
She became president of the Adult Performance Artists Guild (APAG), a federally-recognised union, in February 2018, having previously been vice-president before her predecessor Sean Michaels' resignation.

Other ventures 
In September 2006, Alana and Chris Evans created a porn production company called CreamWorks Films. The studio's first film, Pick 'Em Young, featured Alana performing with 18-21 year old new male performers that were recruited through Myspace. Alana focused on producing and casting while Chris focused on directing and editing.

In November 2008, Alana and Chris Evans launched another production company, Royalty X Films. The company's first film was Super Pink Holes.

On September 20, 2011, Evans and pornographic actress Misti Dawn launched an interactive video gaming website called PwnedByGirls.com, which allows subscribers to play video games with porn stars via Xbox Live or on the PlayStation Network.

In 2012, Evans made her professional singing debut with the song "Pop That Tooshie", which is the lead single from the Lords of Acid album Deep Chills. In June 2014, she released a song titled "Make You Love Me."

In February 2014, Evans began writing a column titled "The Stoned Gamer" for High Times magazine.

Personal life 
In February 2019 she announced on Twitter that she and her husband had amicably separated and were divorcing.

On January 16, 2018, she stated on The Today Show that she supported Bernie Sanders during the 2016 election and in February 2020 told The Daily Beast she would be supporting him again for the 2020 election.

Awards 
2007 AVN Award – Best Solo Sex Scene – Corruption
2015 AVN Hall of Fame
2019 XRCO Hall of Fame
2019 Urban X Hall of Fame

References

External links 

 

Year of birth missing (living people)
Living people
American female adult models
American pornographic film actresses
American female erotic dancers
American erotic dancers
21st-century American women